Cristian Salvador González (born 20 November 1994) is a Spanish footballer who plays for Sporting de Gijón as a central midfielder.

Club career
Born in Zamora, Castile and León, Salvador represented Zamora CF as a youth. On 7 April 2012, aged only 17, he made his senior debut by starting in a 2–0 home win against Sestao River in the Segunda División B championship.

Salvador was promoted to the first team ahead of the 2012–13 season, and began to appear more regularly in the following campaigns. He scored his first senior goal on 5 January 2014, netting the equalizer in a 1–1 home draw against CD Guijuelo.

On 31 July 2015, after Zamora's relegation, Salvador joined fellow third-tier club CD Lealtad. However, Zamora announced that they retained the player seven days later, but he signed for Sestao on 1 September after rescinding his contract.

On 28 July 2016 Salvador moved to Sporting de Gijón, being initially assigned to the reserves in Tercera División. He made his first team debut on 21 December, coming on as a late substitute for Nacho Cases in a 1–3 away loss against SD Eibar for the season's Copa del Rey.

Salvador was definitely promoted to the main squad in Segunda División ahead of the 2018–19 season, after agreeing to a new three-year contract. He scored his first professional goal on 3 March 2019, netting the opener in a 2–1 away success over CD Numancia.

On 7 June 2021, Salvador signed a three-year deal with SD Huesca also in the second division.

Career Statistics

References

External links

1994 births
Living people
People from Zamora, Spain
Sportspeople from the Province of Zamora
Spanish footballers
Footballers from Castilla–La Mancha
Association football midfielders
Segunda División players
Segunda División B players
Tercera División players
Zamora CF footballers
Sestao River footballers
Sporting de Gijón B players
Sporting de Gijón players
SD Huesca footballers